Teichertoceras is a discosorid genus in the family Westonoceratidae characterized by an endogastric curvature to the early portion of the phragmocone.

The shell of Teichertoceras is moderately compressed, the early portion a narrow expanding cyrtocone that in the adult become more swollen, taking on an exogastric aspect.  The body chamber in the adult is contracted toward the aperture.  The siphuncle is ventral. Bullettes at the adapical ends of the connecting rings are small.

Teichertoceras is thought to have given rise to Westonoceras and Faberoceras and to be derived from Ulrichoceras. It is found in geological formations of Middle Ordovician age in North America.

References

 Teichert, C. 1964. Nautiloidea -Discosorida. Treatise on Invertebrate Paleontology, Part K. Geological Society of America and Univ Kansas Press. 
 Flower, R.H. and Teichert, C. 1957. The Cephalopod Order Discosorida. University of Kansas Paleontological Contributions.

Discosorida
Paleozoic life of Nunavut
Prehistoric nautiloid genera